Metarhizium rileyi is a species of entomopathogenic fungus in the family Clavicipitaceae; there is extensive literature under its synonym Nomuraea rileyi.

References

External links
 * 

Clavicipitaceae
Hypocreales genera
Biological pest control
Fungi described in 1883